Robert Marie Joseph "Rob" Meens (born 14 August 1959, Heerlen) is a Dutch historian and professor at Utrecht University.

Meens got his Ph.D. from Nijmegen University in 1994. He was a fellow at the Davis Center for Historical Studies at Princeton University in 1997-1998, and taught at the University of Vienna before an appointment as professor in history in Utrecht.

A specialist in medieval religious culture, he is the co-editor, with Yitzhak Hen, of a collection of essays on the Bobbio Missal, a collection "said to define a new orthodoxy on the subject". He has researched penitentials with a research group at Utrecht (a continuation of the important work done by Raymund Kottje) since the early 2000s, and his Penance in Medieval Europe, 600-1200 was published in 2014 by Cambridge UP.

References

External links
Rob Meens' page at Utrecht University

1959 births
Living people
Academic staff of Utrecht University
Dutch historians of religion
Dutch medievalists
People from Heerlen
Radboud University Nijmegen alumni